Basketball Stars Weert, commonly known as BSW, was a professional basketball team based in Weert, Netherlands. The club was founded in 1968 and played in the Dutch Basketball League. Home games of the team are played in the Sporthal Boshoven.

The club was a regular participant in the Dutch top division, as the side from Weert appeared in the Eredivisie (later DBL) for 34 straight seasons. The highlight of the club was the national championship in the 1993–94 season. The club finished three times as runner-up in the DBL: in 1988, 1993 and 2001. As well, BSW made European appearances with the most notable being the one in the FIBA European Cup Winners' Cup, the highest European level, in 1994–95.

In 2017 the club was dissolved after financial problems and the inability to gain enough money to participate. However, the club was replaced by BAL  from Weert.

Names
BSW has known a lot of different names in its history, mainly because of sponsorship reasons.

1982–1984 : Coveco
1984–1987 : Kaypro
1987–1990 : Miniware
1990–1993 : Selex
1993–1996 : Lanèche
1996–2000 : BS Weert
2000–2002 : Vanilla
2002–2003 : BS Weert
2003–2004 : Solskin
2004–2005 : BS Weert
2005–2010 : Upstairs Weert
2010–2011 : BS Weert
2011–2013 : Stepco
2013–2014 : Maxxcom
2014–2017: BS Weert

Players

Notable players

List of head coaches

Honours 
Dutch Basketball League
 Winners (1): 1993–94
NBB Cup
Runners-up (3): 1992–93, 1993–94, 2000–01

European record

Notes

Season by season

References

External links
Official website

Defunct basketball teams in the Netherlands
Basketball teams established in 1968
Former Dutch Basketball League teams
Basketball teams disestablished in 2017
Sports clubs in Weert